Kung Fu Hustle is a 2004 Cantonese-language action comedy film directed, produced, co-written by, and starring Stephen Chow. The film tells the story of a murderous neighbourhood gang, a poor village with unlikely heroes, and an aspiring gangster's fierce journey to find his true self. Eva Huang, Yuen Wah, Yuen Qiu, Danny Chan Kwok-kwan and Leung Siu-lung co-starred in prominent roles. The martial arts choreography is supervised by Yuen Woo-ping.

Kung Fu Hustle was a co-production between Hong Kong and Mainland Chinese companies, filmed in Shanghai. After the commercial success of Shaolin Soccer, its production company, Star Overseas, began to develop the films with Columbia Pictures Asia in 2002. It features a number of retired actors famous for 1970s Hong Kong action cinema and has been compared to contemporary and influential wuxia films such as Crouching Tiger, Hidden Dragon and Hero. The cartoon special effects in the film accompanied by traditional Chinese music, is often cited as its most striking feature.

The film was released on 23 December 2004 in China and on 25 January 2005 in the United States. The film received positive reviews and grossed US$17 million in North America and US$84 million in other regions. It was tenth on the list of highest-grossing foreign-language films in the United States as well as the highest-grossing foreign-language film in the country in 2005. Kung Fu Hustle won numerous awards, including six Hong Kong Film Awards and five Golden Horse Awards. The film was re-released in 3D in October 2014 across Asia and America, marking the tenth anniversary of the film.

Plot 
In 1940s Shanghai, petty crooks Sing and Bone aspire to join the notorious Axe Gang under the leadership of the cold-blooded killer Brother Sum. The pair visit a rundown slum known as Pigsty Alley to extort the residents by pretending to be Axe members. Sing's actions eventually attract the real gang, who confront the villagers. Gang reinforcements arrive but they are all quickly dealt with by three of the slum's tenants: Coolie, Tailor, and Donut, who reveal they are actually kung fu masters. However, fearing the Axe Gang's retaliation, the slum's Landlady evicts the trio.

Brother Sum captures Sing and Bone, intending to kill them for posing as gang members. However, Sing and Bone narrowly escape. Impressed, Brother Sum allows them to join the gang on the condition that they kill someone. Sing recalls his childhood to Bone when he was tricked by a vagrant into buying a martial arts pamphlet with his meager savings. After practicing the pamphlet's Buddhist Palm technique, Sing attempted to save a mute girl named Fong from bullies but was instead beaten and humiliated. Sing became adamant that heroes never win and resolved to be a villain.

Sing and Bone return to Pigsty Alley to kill the Landlady but fail and are chased off the premises. Sing, injured in the process, retreats to a traffic pulpit where his body mysteriously heals in no time. Meanwhile, Brother Sum, intent on gaining revenge on the Pigsty Alley residents, hires two Harpists that use a magical guzheng as their weapon. They successfully eliminate the three masters but are defeated by both the Landlady and her husband Landlord, who reveal themselves to be skilled fighters as well. 

A frustrated Sing attempts to rob an ice cream vendor but discovers that she is actually Fong. When she recognizes him and offers him a lollipop, he smashes it and leaves in shame. Brother Sum offers Sing immediate gang membership if he uses his lock-picking skills to free the Beast, a legendary assassin, from a mental asylum. Sing brings the Beast back to the Axe Gang's headquarters.

Brother Sum is initially skeptical of the Beast due to his flippant attitude and sloppy appearance, but quickly changes his mind when the Beast stops a bullet midair. The Beast meets the Landlady and Landlord at the casino next door, engaging in a fierce fight with them that ends in a stalemate. Sing, realizing the error of his ways, attacks the Beast, who angrily retaliates. The Landlady and Landlord grab the unconscious Sing and flee. The Beast eliminates Brother Sum and takes over as leader of the Axes.

The Landlady and Landlord treat Sing at Pigsty Alley and are surprised by his quick recovery. The Landlady deduces Sing is, in fact, a natural-born kung fu genius. With his newfound powers, Sing effortlessly dispatches the Axes before fighting the Beast. Sing embraces the Buddha and uses the Buddhist Palm to neutralize the Beast, who concedes defeat. 

Sing and Bone open a candy store with Fong's lollipop as their logo. Fong visits Sing at his store, and the pair embrace. The vagrant who sold the pamphlet to Sing can be seen outside selling other pamphlets.

Cast 
 Stephen Chow as Sing, a loser in life who joins the Axe Gang but soon finds a higher calling. He specialises in the Fut Gar Buddhist Palm technique. After the Beast beats Sing to the brink of death, Sing "resets his qi flow", releasing the natural-born kung fu master within.
 Danny Chan Kwok-kwan as Brother Sum, the ruthless leader of the Axe Gang. Under his leadership, the Axe Gang wipes out all the other gangs of China.
 Yuen Qiu as the Landlady of Pigsty Alley. She is a master of the Lama Pai Lion's Roar technique. She has a sonic scream that can pierce through anything.
 Yuen Wah as the Landlord of Pigsty Alley. He is a master of kung fu specializing in Tai Chi. He is flexible and able to hover in midair.
 Leung Siu-lung as the Beast, an old but incredibly strong kung fu master. He is rumoured to be the most dangerous person alive, though his skill is disguised by his unkempt appearance. He is a master of the Toad Style from the Kwan Lun School. He can act as a toad including super-leaps and headbutt a person with immense force.
 Xing Yu as Coolie, a Kung Fu specialist of the Tan Tui Twelve Kicks technique from the Tam School. He has incredibly fast legs and can sense when an opponent is approaching.
 Chiu Chi-ling as the Tailor of Pigsty Alley. He specialises in the Hung Ga Iron Wire Fist technique and fights with iron rings on his arms.
 Dong Zhihua as Donut, a baker in Pigsty Alley. He specialises in the Eight Trigram Staff. He is a master of using staves and spears in battle.
 Lam Chi-chung as Bone, Sing's obese sidekick who tends to follow Sing around.
 Eva Huang as Fong, Sing's mute love interest and childhood acquaintance. Sing saved her from bullies when she was young.
 Tin Kai-man as Brother Sum's adviser. He takes over as the head of the Axe Gang after Brother Sum is killed.
 Gar Hong-hay and Fung Hak-on as the Harpists, two assassins hired by the Axe Gang who kill their victims with a magical guzheng, or "Chinese harp".
 Lam Suet and Liang Hsiao as high-ranking members of the Axe Gang.
 Yuen Cheung-yan as the Beggar, the man who sold Sing the Buddha's Palm manual. He is a fraud who tricks kids to make money for himself. Yuen is the brother of Yuen Woo-ping, the film's fight choreographer.
 Feng Xiaogang as the leader of the Crocodile Gang. He is killed by the Axe Gang at the start of the film. He was the last gang leader to be killed by Brother Sum.

Background
The climate of the film industry and the expectation of a 21st-century action film were different throughout the history of Chinese cinema. However, this difference provides one of the reasons why Kung Fu Hustle was so well received.

Directors and their contemporaries changed the martial arts cinema together to gain more universal appeal. The work has built martial arts as a viable mode of behavioural expression in the movie, and also displayed how martial arts could be transformed in the cinema industry to reflect both "contemporary local issues and the increasingly important reality of globalization." Unlike Ang Lee's wuxia film, Crouching Tiger, Hidden Dragon, Stephen Chow chose to use the perspective of a lowly gangster to break into Wuxia and Jianghu. Kung Fu does not succeed because it is so localised. Quite the contrary, Kung Fu Hustle embodies a complex transnationalism.

While martial arts began a new wave in Chinese cinema, Stephen Chow and other directors were responsible for the creation of another subset of martial arts cinema, which included the vampire genre. Stephen Chow combined elements such as undead, Taoism, kung fu, as well as comedy into his movies, which helped create a comedy-horror feel that was distinct to Hong Kong. The beginning of martial arts movies has paved the future for both local and international directors. They started to learn and adopt martial arts to fulfill and satisfy their own demands, later the trend became a transnational market.

Different from traditional Chinese wuxia cinema, Chow's new kung fu movies help with reflecting the extent to force the of globalisation within the entertainment industry, which later influenced the local construction of self-identity.

Production

Development 

Kung Fu Hustle is a co-production of the Beijing Film Studio and Hong Kong's Star Overseas. After the success of his 2001 film, Shaolin Soccer, Chow was approached in 2002 by Columbia Pictures Film Production Asia, offering to collaborate with him on a project. Chow accepted the offer, and the project eventually became Kung Fu Hustle. Kung Fu Hustle was produced with a budget of US$20 million.

Chow was inspired to create the film by the martial arts films he watched as a child and by his childhood ambition to become a martial artist. A senior Hollywood executive said Chow was "forced to grind through four successive scripts" and "found it very laborious".

Chow's first priority was to design the main location of the film, "Pigsty Alley". Later in an interview Chow remarked that he had created the location from his childhood, basing the design on the crowded apartment complexes of Hong Kong where he had lived. The 1973 Shaw Brothers Studio film, The House of 72 Tenants, was another inspiration for Pigsty Alley. Designing the Alley began in January 2003 and took four months to complete. Many of the props and furniture in the apartments were antiques from all over China.

Casting 
Kung Fu Hustle features several prolific Hong Kong action cinema actors from the 1970s. Yuen Wah, a former student of the China Drama Academy Peking Opera School who appeared in over a hundred Hong Kong films and was a stunt double for Bruce Lee, played the Landlord of Pigsty Alley. Wah considered starring in Kung Fu Hustle to be the peak of his career. In spite of the film's success, he worried that nowadays fewer people practice martial arts.

Auditions for the role of the Landlady began in March 2003. Yuen Qiu, who did not audition, was spotted during her friend's screen test smoking a cigarette with a sarcastic expression on her face, which won her the part. Qiu, a student of Yu Jim-yuen, sifu of the China Drama Academy, had appeared in the 1974 James Bond film The Man with the Golden Gun at the age of 18. After a number of other small roles, she retired from films in the 1980s. Kung Fu Hustle was her first role in nineteen years. Qiu, in order to fulfill Chow's vision for the role, gained weight for the role by eating midnight snacks every day.

Bruce Leung, who played the Beast, was Stephen Chow's childhood martial arts hero. Leung Siu Lung was a famous action film director and actor in the 1970s and 1980s, known as the "Third Dragon" after Bruce Lee and Jackie Chan. After becoming unpopular in the Taiwanese film market in the late 1980s following a visit to China, he switched to a career in business. Kung Fu Hustle was his return to the film industry after a fifteen-year hiatus. He regarded Chow as a flexible director with high standards, and was particularly impressed by the first scene involving the Beast, which had to be reshot 28 times.

In addition to famous martial artists, Kung Fu Hustle features legends of Chinese cinema. Two famous Chinese directors appear in the film: Zhang Yibai, who plays Inspector Chan at the beginning of the film, and Feng Xiaogang, who plays the boss of the Crocodile Gang.

In casting Sing's love interest Fong, Chow stated that he wanted an innocent looking girl for the role. Television actress Eva Huang, in her film debut, was chosen from over 8,000 women. When asked about his decision in casting her, Chow said that he "just had a feeling about her" and that he enjoyed working with new actors. She chose to have no dialogue in the film so that she could stand out only with her body gestures.

Filming 

Filming took place in Shanghai from June 2003 to November 2003. Two-thirds of the time was spent shooting the fight sequences. Those scenes were initially choreographed by Sammo Hung, who quit after two months due to illness, tough outdoor conditions, interest in another project and arguments with the production crew. Hung was replaced by Yuen Woo-ping, an action choreographer with experience ranging from 1960s Hong Kong action cinema to more recent films like Crouching Tiger, Hidden Dragon and The Matrix. Yuen promptly accepted the offer. Yuen drew on seemingly outdated wuxia fighting styles like the Deadly Melody and Buddhist Palm. He remarked that despite the comedic nature of the film, the shooting process was a serious matter due to the tight schedule.

Most of the special effects in the film, created by Hong Kong computer graphics company Centro Digital Pictures Limited, which had previously worked on films such as Shaolin Soccer and Kill Bill, included a combination of computer-generated imagery and wire work. Centro Digital performed extensive tests on CGI scenes before filming started, and treatment of the preliminary shots began immediately afterwards. The CGI crew edited out wire effects and applied special effects in high resolution. Legendary martial arts mentioned in wuxia novels were depicted and exaggerated through CGI, but actual people were used for the final fight between Chow's character and hundreds of axe-wielding gangsters. After a final calibration of colour, data of the processed scenes was sent to the US for the production of the final version. A group of six people followed the production crew throughout the shooting.

Music 

The majority of the film's original score was composed by Raymond Wong and performed by the Hong Kong Chinese Orchestra. The score imitates traditional Chinese music used in 1940s swordplay films. One of Wong's works, Nothing Ventured, Nothing Gained, provides a stark contrast between the villainous Axe Gang and the peaceful neighbourhood of Pigsty Alley, depicted by a Chinese folk song, Fisherman's Song of the East China Sea. Along with Wong's compositions and various traditional Chinese songs, classical compositions are featured in the score, including excerpts from Zigeunerweisen by Pablo de Sarasate and Sabre Dance by Aram Khachaturian. The song, Zhiyao Weini Huo Yitian (Only Want to Live One Day for You), is sung in the background by Eva Huang at the end of the film. Written by Liu Chia-chang in the 1970s, it tells of a girl's memories of a loved one, and her desire to live for him again. Kung Fu Hustle was nominated for Best Original Film Score at the 24th Hong Kong Film Awards.

Asian and American versions of the soundtrack were released. The Asian version of the soundtrack was released on 17 December 2004 by Sony Music Entertainment and has 33 tracks. The American version of the soundtrack was released on 29 March 2005 by Varèse Sarabande and has 19 tracks, with 14 tracks missing compared to the Asian release.

The soundtrack for the trailer was mastered at Epiphany Music and Recording, Inc. in Santa Rosa, California.

References to other works 

Kung Fu Hustle makes references to a wide range of films, animated cartoons, wuxia novels, anime and other sources. The housing arrangement of the Pigsty Alley is similar to that of a 1973 Hong Kong film, The House of 72 Tenants. It is set in a Shanghai Shantytown taking Hong Kong viewers back to their days of hardship but also making the audience in mainland China interested in, as Ho pointed out, "Chow appropriates Hong Kong's past to address China's current anxieties over rapid modernization and secures the former colony's bond with its semi-reunited motherland-in both emotional and film business terms". There are two references to Chow's previous film, Shaolin Soccer: When Sing arrives at Pigsty Alley, he plays skilfully with a soccer ball, then says, "You're still playing football?". The second reference is the scene in which a clerk beats Sing up on a bus. The clerk also appeared in Shaolin Soccer as the leader of an opposing team who used hidden weapons to beat up the Shaolin soccer team. When Sing challenges a boy in the Pigsty Alley, Sing calls him "The Karate Kid", a reference to the 1984 film of the same name. During the altercation between Sing and the hairdresser, the hairdresser states, "Even if you kill me, there will be thousands more of me!". This is a reference to a famous quote made by Lu Haodong, a Chinese revolutionary in the late Qing dynasty. The scene in which Sing is chased by the Landlady as he flees from the Alley is a homage to Wile E. Coyote and the Road Runner, characters in the Looney Tunes cartoons, even including the pursuer's (the Landlady's) ill fate. During the opening scene in which the leader of the Crocodile Gang is killed by Brother Sum of the Axe Gang, in the background a poster for the 1939 film Le Jour Se Lève is visible. In the scene in which Sing robs the ice cream vendor, a poster for the 1935 film Top Hat is in the background. As Sing arrives at the door to the Beast's cell in the mental asylum, he hallucinates a large wave of blood rushing from the cell door, similar to a scene in The Shining. The Landlady says at one point, "Tomorrow is another day", which is a line from the 1936 novel Gone with the Wind and its 1939 film adaptation.

A major element of the plot is based on the wuxia film series Palm of Ru Lai, released in 1964. Sing studied the fighting style used in Palm of Ru Lai ("Buddhist Palm style"), from a young age and used it at the end of Kung Fu Hustle. In reality, the Buddhist Palm fighting style does not leave palm-shaped craters and holes on impact. Instead, the user delivers powerful punches using his palm. The Beast's name in Chinese, Huoyun Xieshen (Evil Deity of the Fiery Cloud), and the fight with the Landlady and her husband are also references to the Palm of Ru Lai, in which a mortally wounded master strikes the patterns of his art's final techniques into a bell so that his apprentice can learn from it. Kung Fu Hustle also contains direct references to characters from Louis Cha's wuxia novels. For example, the landlord and landlady refer to themselves as Yang Guo and Xiaolongnü, the names of characters in Cha's The Return of the Condor Heroes, when they met the Beast.

References to gangster films are also present. Many fight scenes and superhuman power displayed by Kung Fu Masters in the film are reminiscent of Dragon Ball Z and similar anime. The boss of the Axe Gang, Brother Sum is named after Hon Sam / Hon Sum, the triad boss played by Eric Tsang in Infernal Affairs. The Harpists imitate The Blues Brothers, wearing similar hats and sunglasses at all times. When they are flattered by the Axe Gang advisor, one of them answers, "Strictly speaking we're just musicians", similar to a line by Elwood Blues.

When Donut dies, he says, "In great power lies great responsibility", a reference to 2002's Spider-Man, said by Uncle Ben before his death. Additionally, in that scene, the Landlady says, "Like Donut said, everyone has his reasons", a reference to Jean Renoir's 1939 film The Rules of the Game. Afterwards, with his dying breath, Donut gets up, grabs the Landlord by the shirt and utters in English, "What are you prepared to do?", a nod to Sean Connery's character Jim Malone in Brian De Palma's 1987 film The Untouchables.

The dialogue that the Beast says while negotiating with the Axe Gang for killing the Landlady and Landlord—"...then young friend, I will make an offer you cannot refuse", is a reference of the dialogue from the movie The Godfather. Also, the Landlady's comment to Brother Sum—"We brought a gift you cannot refuse" is an obvious parody of the same, to which Sum replies (in the dubbed version of the film), "Ha! With the Beast on our side, we shall see for whom the bell tolls", a reference to the 1943 film.

The final fight between Sing (who has been reborn into "the one", which pays homage to Bruce Lee by wearing his costume in Enter the Dragon and using his fighting style) and the hundreds of gangsters imitates the fight between Neo and hundreds of Agent Smiths in The Matrix Reloaded. The scene in which the Beast prompts an Axe member to punch him harder is reminiscent of a similar scene in Raging Bull, with Robert De Niro's character prompting Joe Pesci's character.

The last scene, in which the beggar tries to sell martial arts manuals, refers directly to the greatest skills in Louis Cha's Condor Trilogy (Nine Yang Manual, "Yiyang Finger", and "Eighteen Subduing Dragon Palms"), "Thousand Hand Divine Fist", and The Smiling, Proud Wanderer ("Nine Swords of Dugu"). The scene in which the landlady confronts Brother Sum in the back of his car is a homage to Bruce Lee in Way of the Dragon, where she cracks her knuckles and gives a quick upper nod to the mafia boss, telling him to back off.

Releases 
Kung Fu Hustle premiered at the 2004 Toronto International Film Festival. It was later released across East Asia including China, Hong Kong and Malaysia in December 2004. The film was first shown in the US at the Sundance Film Festival in January 2005, and then opened in a general release on 22 April 2005 after being shown in Los Angeles and New York for two weeks.

The North American DVD release was on 8 August 2005. A Blu-ray version of the DVD was released on 12 December 2006 by Sony Pictures. A UMD version of the film was released for the PlayStation Portable. The United States DVD releases were censored, cutting a number of scenes that featured lots of blood or human excrement. A later release, called "The Kick-Axe Edition", restored these scenes.

In the United Kingdom the standard DVD was released 24 October 2005, the same day a special edition was released with collector's items, which included playing cards, a keyring, a sweat band, and an inflatable axe. On 8 April 2007, Sony Pictures Home Entertainment released a Blu-ray version.

The Portuguese title of the film is Kungfusão, which sounds like Kung Fu and Confusão (confusion). In the same way as Kungfusão, the Italian and Spanish titles were Kung-fusion and Kung-fusión, puns of "confusion". In France, the film is known as Crazy Kung Fu, and the Hungarian title is A Pofonok Földje, meaning The Land of Punches.

In Korea a Limited Collector's Edition DVD was released which included a leather wallet, Stephen Chow's Palm Figure with his signature, a photo album and Special Kung Fu's Booklet with a certificate of authenticity.

Reception 
On Rotten Tomatoes, the film received a 90% approval rating based on 182 reviews and an average rating of 7.7/10. The site's critical consensus reads: "Kung Fu Hustle blends special effects, martial arts, and the Looney Toons to hilarious effect." On Metacritic, the film received a score of 78 out of 100 based on 38 critics, indicating "generally favorable reviews."

Hong Kong director and film critic Gabriel Wong praised the film for its black comedy, special effects and nostalgia, citing the return of many retired kung fu actors from the 1970s. Film critic Roger Ebert's description of the film ("like Jackie Chan and Buster Keaton meet Quentin Tarantino and Bugs Bunny") was printed on the promotion posters for the film in the US. Other critics described it as a comedic version of Crouching Tiger, Hidden Dragon. Positive reviews generally gave credit to the elements of mo lei tau comedy present in the film. A number of reviewers viewed it as a computer-enhanced Looney Tunes punch-up. In a 2010 interview, actor Bill Murray called Kung Fu Hustle "the supreme achievement of the modern age in terms of comedy". In 2021, American filmmaker James Gunn called it "the greatest film ever made".

The combination of the necessary cynicism and sentential nostalgia which makes the audience laugh implies that a world of human complexity is beneath the interesting deceptive surface.

Much of the criticism for the film was directed at its lack of character development and a coherent plot. Las Vegas Weekly, for instance, criticised the film for not having enough of a central protagonist and character depth. Criticism was also directed towards the film's cartoonish and childish humour. However, it was considered reasonable, as the Kung Fu Hustle production team chose to make the film's characters largely one-dimensional. In the movie, the directors "attempt(ed) to appeal to a transnational audience, affirms distinctly Western notions of Chinese that many earlier Kung Fu films set out to subvert." The Kung Fu Hustle team attempt to appeal to a more progressive generation throughout the history of Chinese cinema. Earlier in the kung fu film industry, it usually involved complex characters, and also tried to explore and expose constructs ranging from gender to race as well as to nation. One-dimension is the key feature of Kung Fu Hustle, as it is rooted in a filmic genre that connected with Hong Kong identity, but also represented the Western imagination of China's past and Kung Fu heroism.

Box office 
Kung Fu Hustle opened in Hong Kong on 23 December 2004, and earned HK$4,990,000 on its opening day. It stayed at the top of the box office for the rest of 2004 and for much of early 2005, eventually grossing HK$61.27 million. Its box office tally made it the highest-grossing film in Hong Kong history, until it was beaten by You Are the Apple of My Eye in 2011. The phenomenal box office this work generated as well as the collective pleasure its local audience experienced potentially saved the Hong Kong film industry during a politically unstable time in the territory.

Sony Pictures Classics opened Kung Fu Hustle in limited theatrical release in New York City and Los Angeles on 8 April 2005 before being widely released across North America on 22 April. In its first week of limited release in seven cinemas, it grossed US$269,225 (US$38,461 per screen). When it was expanded to a wide release in 2,503 cinemas, the largest number of cinemas ever for a foreign language film, it made a modest US$6,749,572 (US$2,696 per screen), eventually grossing a total of US$17,108,591 in 129 days. In total, Kung Fu Hustle had a worldwide gross of US$101,104,669. While not a blockbuster, Kung Fu Hustle managed to become the highest-grossing foreign-language film in North America in 2005 and went on to generate more than US$30,000,000 in the United States home video market.

Accolades 
The film was nominated for sixteen Hong Kong Film Awards, out of which winning Best Picture, Best Action Choreography, Best Film Editing, Best Sound Effects, Best Supporting Actor and Best Visual Effects. Five more awards were later picked up at the Golden Horse Awards including an award for Best Director for Stephen Chow. In the United States Kung Fu Hustle was well received by various film critic associations winning awards for Best Foreign Language Film from Boston-, Chicago-, Las Vegas- and Phoenix-based critics. it was later nominated for six Satellite Awards and one MTV Movie Award for best fight scene. In the United Kingdom at 59th British Academy Film Awards the film was nominated for a BAFTA.

In 2011, the Taipei Golden Horse Film Festival listed Kung Fu Hustle at number 48 in their list of "100 Greatest Chinese-Language Films". The majority of the voters originated from Taiwan, and included film scholars, festival programmers, film directors, actors and producers. In 2014, Time Out polled several film critics, directors, actors and stunt actors to list their top action films. Kung Fu Hustle was listed at 50th place on this list.

Sequel 
In 2005, Chow announced that there would be a sequel to Kung Fu Hustle, although he had not settled on a female lead. "There will be a lot of new characters in the movie. We'll need a lot of new actors. It's possible that we'll look for people abroad besides casting locals". In January 2013, during an interview, Chow admitted that plans for making Kung Fu Hustle 2 have been put on hold. "I was indeed in the midst of making the movie, but it is currently put on hold in view of other incoming projects". Production of Kung Fu Hustle 2 was delayed while Chow filmed the science fiction adventure film CJ7. As a result, Kung Fu Hustle 2 was slated for a 2014 release. By 2017, Chow had already completed The Mermaid and Journey to the West: The Demons Strike Back. Due to his focus on behind-the-scenes production and the fact that he has not made an appearance since CJ7, it was suspected that he had stopped acting. However, Chow clarified that he still wants to act, but has not found a role suited for him. Kung Fu Hustle 2 remains incomplete. In February 2019, during a promo interview for The New King of Comedy, Stephen confirmed that the sequel is in the works. He will direct the movie and possibly cameo in the film, but the story will not be a direct sequel to the first one. Chow explains the sequel will be a spiritual successor to the first one, but set in modern times.

Games

Online and mobile games 
In 2004 a promotional flash game was released by Sony Pictures Entertainment on their Japanese website. The game was created by Japanese game developer Point Zero and plays as a point-and-click beat 'em up. A side-scrolling game designed for mobile phones was later released in 2006 by developer Tracebit.

MMO 
In 2007 Sony Online Entertainment announced that a massively multiplayer online 2D side-scrolling fighter game based on the film was under development for the Chinese market. Two years later a preview of the game was featured at E3 where it received mixed reviews from critics with many comparing it to similar MMO games such as Guild Wars and Phantasy Star Online.

A North American release for PC and PS3 was planned for late 2009, but never came to fruition. The game was only available in Asia for the PC.

See also 

 Cinema of Hong Kong
 Cinema of China
 Kung Fu Panda (film) — A 2008 Hollywood film inspired by Kung Fu Hustle.
 Chandni Chowk to China — A 2009 Bollywood film inspired by Kung Fu Hustle.
 Everything Everywhere All at Once — A 2022 Hollywood film inspired by Kung Fu Hustle.
 List of films featuring the deaf and hard of hearing

References

External links 

 
 
 Kung Fu Hustle at LoveHKFilm.com
 
 The Six Degrees of Stephen Chow and Kung Fu Hustle

2004 films
2004 action comedy films
2004 comedy films
2004 martial arts films
2000s Cantonese-language films
2000s martial arts comedy films
2000s parody films
2000s satirical films
Metafictional works
Best Film HKFA
Chinese action comedy films
Chinese martial arts comedy films
Chinese New Year films
Chinese satirical films
Columbia Pictures films
Hong Kong action comedy films
Hong Kong martial arts comedy films
2000s buddy films
Hong Kong slapstick comedy films
Kung fu films
Films directed by Stephen Chow
Films set in the 1940s
Films set in Shanghai
Films shot in Shanghai
Films whose director won the Best Director Golden Horse Award
Second Sino-Japanese War films
Sony Pictures Classics films
Triad films
2000s Hong Kong films